Indiana University School of Law may refer to either of two independent law schools operated by the Indiana University system, namely:

Indiana University Maurer School of Law (IU Maurer), located on the campus of Indiana University Bloomington
Indiana University Robert H. McKinney School of Law (IU McKinney), located on the campus of Indiana University – Purdue University Indianapolis